Clearance can refer to:

Engineering
 Engineering tolerance, a physical distance or space between two components
 Ride height (vehicle clearance)
 Hydraulic clearance
 Clearance in civil engineering
 Ground clearance, the amount of space between the base of an automobile tire and the underside of the chassis
 The difference between the loading gauge and the structure gauge, the amount of space between the top of a rail car and the top of a tunnel or the bottom of a rail car and the top of rail
 Air draft, applies to bridges across navigable waterways
 Clearance car, a type of railroad car used to check clearances around the tracks

Finance and trade

Intellectual property
 Collective rights management, the licensing of copyright and related rights
 Sample clearance, legal permission to re-use a recording in another work

Other uses in finance and trade
 Cheque clearing, the process of transferring value on a cheque from one bank account to another
 The activity of a Clearing house (finance) where a variety of financial instruments are cleared through the issuing institution 
 Customs clearance, in international trade, the movement of goods through customs barriers
 Market clearing or equilibrium price, the price at which quantity supplied is equal to quantity demanded
 Closeout (sale), in retail, the final sale of items to zero inventory

Other uses
 Authorization or permission from an authority
 Air traffic control clearance in aviation
 Security clearance, a status granted to individuals allowing them access to classified information
 Clearance (pharmacology), the rate at which a substance is removed or cleared from the body by the kidneys or in renal dialysis
 Clearance rate, in criminal justice, the number of crimes "cleared" divided by the number reported
 Deforestation, the deliberate clearance of woodland or forest for human development
 A chess term for removal of pieces from a rank, file or diagonal so that a bishop, rook or queen is free to move along it
 The Highland Clearances, eviction of tenants in the Scottish Highlands during the 18th and 19th centuries
 The Lowland Clearances, eviction of tenants as part of the Scottish Agricultural Revolution in the Scottish Lowlands
 In Australian rules football, the clearing of the ball out of a ball-up situation

See also 
 Clear (disambiguation)
 Clearing (disambiguation)